Kolatak is a village de facto in the Martakert Province of the breakaway Republic of Artsakh, de jure in the Kalbajar District of Azerbaijan, in the disputed region of Nagorno-Karabakh. The village has an ethnic Armenian-majority population, and also had an Armenian majority in 1989.

Situated on a mountain above the village is the Armenian monastery of Hakobavank, from between the 7th and 13th centuries.

History 
During the Soviet period, the village was a part of the Mardakert District of the Nagorno-Karabakh Autonomous Oblast.

Historical heritage sites 
Historical heritage sites in and around the village include the monastery of Hakobavank (also known as the monastery of Metsaranits) from between the 7th and 13th centuries, the fortress of Kachaghakaberd in the mountains to the south - an important fortress in the medieval Armenian Principality of Khachen, the medieval fortress of Berdakar, khachkars from between the 9th and 13th centuries, the church of Koshik Anapat, the fortress of Isarantsots and a cemetery from between the 12th and 13th centuries, a 13th-century church, the village of Alan Veran and a cemetery from between the 16th and 18th centuries, the 17th-century Mandur Church, the 17th/18th-century village of Hndzan, a 19th-century oil mill, and a cave.

Economy and culture 
The population is mainly engaged in agriculture and animal husbandry. As of 2015, the village has a municipal building, a secondary school, and a medical centre.

Demographics 
The village had 273 inhabitants in 2005, and 250 inhabitants in 2015.

Gallery

References

External links 

 
 

Populated places in Martakert Province
Populated places in Kalbajar District